Bezi is a village in Győr-Moson-Sopron county, Hungary.

The village was founded by Pechenegs. Its first lords were the Bezys, but since the 16th century the  Márffy, Cseszneky and Poki families had here noble estates. In the 17th century Péter Pázmány was the most important possessor.

External links 
 Street map 

Populated places in Győr-Moson-Sopron County